Real to Reel is a studio album by hard rock band Tesla. Released on June 5, 2007, it includes covers of classic rock songs from the late 1960s and early 1970s recorded by Tesla in their own style using analog tape and vintage equipment.
Best Buy included a limited, exclusive Bonus CD with the purchase of "Real to Reel". This Bonus CD includes 4 songs, "War Pigs" from Reel Two, and unplugged versions of "Shine Away", "Modern Day Cowboy" and "Paradise".

Additional 12 tracks recorded during the Real to Reel sessions, were released on a second volume, entitled Real to Reel, Vol. 2.

Track listing

Best Buy Bonus Disc
This is a limited-edition CD included with "Real to Reel", only sold through Best Buy. It includes a Black Sabbath cover and 3 previously released Tesla songs in unplugged versions.

Personnel
Jeff Keith - lead vocals
Frank Hannon - guitar, backing vocals
Brian Wheat - bass, piano, backing vocals
Troy Luccketta - drums, percussion
Dave Rude - guitars, backing vocals

External links
Tesla official web site

References

2007 albums
Covers albums
Tesla (band) albums